The Gorai Creek is a creek off the coast of suburban Mumbai. It lies between Borivali (West) and Gorai Village. A ferry ride across the creek to Essel World, Gorai Beach and the Global Vipassana Pagoda takes around 10 to 15 minutes.

References 

Estuaries of Mumbai
Borivali